Andrey Sklyarenko (born 10 January 1976) is a retired Kazakhstani hurdler who specialized in the 110 metres hurdles.

As a junior he won the silver medal at the 1994 Asian Junior Championships and competed at the 1994 World Junior Championships without reaching the final. Sklyarenko won the 1995, 1997 and 1999 Central Asian Games, won the bronze medal at the 1998 Asian Championships and the silver medal at the 1998 Asian Games. He competed at the 1997 and 2001 World Championships without reaching the final.

His personal best time was 13.78 seconds, achieved in June 1998 in Istanbul. He had 7.87 seconds in the 60 metres hurdles, achieved in February 1999 in Moscow.

References

1976 births
Living people
Kazakhstani male hurdlers
World Athletics Championships athletes for Kazakhstan
Athletes (track and field) at the 1998 Asian Games
Asian Games medalists in athletics (track and field)
Asian Games silver medalists for Kazakhstan
Medalists at the 1998 Asian Games